Burnside is a native village and census-designated place (CDP) on the Navajo Nation in Apache County, Arizona, United States. The population was 537 at the 2010 census.

Geography
Burnside is located at  (35.755138, -109.630277).

Demographics

Burnside first appeared on the 2000 U.S. Census as a census-designated place (CDP).

As of the census of 2000, there were 632 people, 173 households, and 134 families residing in the CDP. There were 216 housing units at an average density of 23.2/sq mi (9.0/km2). The racial makeup of the CDP was 92% Native American, 7% White, 1% from other races, and <1% from two or more races.  1% of the population were Hispanic or Latino of any race.

There were 173 households, out of which 49% had children under the age of 18 living with them, 38% were married couples living together, 33% had a female householder with no husband present, and 22% were non-families. 21% of all households were made up of individuals, and 4% had someone living alone who was 65 years of age or older.  The average household size was 3.65 and the average family size was 4.35.

In the CDP, the age distribution of the population shows 45% under the age of 18, 10% from 18 to 24, 27% from 25 to 44, 14% from 45 to 64, and 4% who were 65 years of age or older.  The median age was 21 years. For every 100 females, there were 92.7 males.  For every 100 females age 18 and over, there were 85.6 males.

The median income for a household in the CDP was $24,063, and the median income for a family was $25,441. Males had a median income of $18,661 versus $21,389 for females. The per capita income for the CDP was $8,236.  About 31% of families and 39% of the population were below the poverty line, including 48% of those under age 18 and 13% of those age 65 or over.

Education
Burnside is served by the Ganado Unified School District.

The area is served by Ganado Primary School, Ganado Intermediate School, Ganado Middle School, and Ganado High School.

See also

 List of census-designated places in Arizona

References

External links

Census-designated places in Apache County, Arizona
Populated places on the Navajo Nation